St Patrick's Cathedral is the seat of the Roman Catholic Diocese of Ballarat, Victoria, Australia. The cathedral was built between 1857 and 1871 designed by local architects Shaw and Dowden but was based on a design of English architect Charles Hansom.

The foundation stone was laid on 7 February 1858 by Bishop James Alipius Goold, with the first Mass being celebrated in 1863. The official opening was in 1871.

References 

Roman Catholic cathedrals in Victoria (Australia)
Roman Catholic churches completed in 1871
Roman Catholic Archdiocese of Melbourne
1871 establishments in Australia
19th-century Roman Catholic church buildings in Australia